Ousainou Darboe (born 8 August 1948) is a Gambian politician and lawyer who serves as the National Assembly Minority Leader since April 2022. He previously served as Vice-President of the Gambia and Minister of Women's Affairs from June 2018 to March 2019, under President Adama Barrow. He also served as Barrow's Minister of Foreign Affairs from February 2017 to June 2018.

Darboe is a human rights lawyer, and worked for the Attorney General's Chambers before entering private practice. He has served as advisor to several companies and government agencies, and was also for a time the vice president of the Gambia Bar Association. He founded the United Democratic Party (UDP) in 1996. It was the main opposition party under the rule of Yahya Jammeh, and Darboe himself stood in the 1996, 2001, and 2006 presidential elections. He was imprisoned in 2016, but released after Barrow's victory.

Early life and education 
Darboe was born in 1948, the son of Numukunda Darboe, who served as a member of parliament for Lower Falluda West, and as communications secretary for Pierre Sarr N'Jie's United Party.  Darboe attended Bansang Primary School and then proceeded to Banjul, where he studied at Saint Augustine High School and Gambia High School. Darboe was the recipient of a Commonwealth scholarship to study law at the University of Lagos in Nigeria. He also later studied a master's degree in law from the University of Ottawa, Canada. He is the first Gambian lawyer from the Mandinka ethnic group.

Legal career 
Darboe was called to the Federal Bar of Nigeria in 1973 and returned to the Gambia in May 1973 to take up a role as a state prosecutor. He was called to the Gambian bar in November 1973, becoming the first Gambian lawyer from the Mandinka ethnic group. He then worked at the Attorney General's Chambers, firstly as a state counsel, then as acting registrar-general, and then as a legal draftsman, before resigning in 1980 in protests against the government's use of draconian legislation to suppress opposition.

Darboe then entered a private practice, working as a human rights barrister. He founded Basansang Chambers in 1980. He was later joined as a senior partner by Neneh M.C. Cham and Lamin Darboe. Darboe is credited with having saved the lives of over 200 Gambians from the death penalty. Following the failed 1981 coup against Dawda Jawara's government, Darboe successfully defended many involved, including Pap Cheyassin Secka and Sheriff Mustapha Dibba who were both tried for treason. Darboe also represented the majority of those detained under 'Emergency Powers' following the coup.

He has worked as a legal advisor to many major Gambian companies and organisations, including Gamtel, Continent Bank (which dissolved in 2003), Gambia Public Transport Corporation, and the Social Security and Housing Finance Corporation. He also continued to provide advice and representation on a pro bono basis. He served the Gambia Bar Association for several years as its vice president and was also a member of the National Advisory Committee on the selection of judges to the International Court of Justice.

Political career

Major opposition politician 
1994 in the Gambia saw a military coup, propelling Yahya Jammeh into the role of head of state. In August 1996, Darboe founded the United Democratic Party based on "democracy, constitutionalism and the rule of law", and became its first leader. He first ran for president in the 1996 presidential election, where he came second to Jammeh, winning 35.84% of the vote to Jammeh's 55.77%. However, the election was widely criticised by observers for its flaws.

In June 2000, while on the campaign trail for the 2001 election, his convoy was ambushed by supporters of the Jammeh regime. One attacker, Alieu Njie, was killed in the process. Darboe and 20 others were arrested and held in Basse police station before being transferred to the high court in Banjul and being granted bail.

He ran again in the 2001 election, representing a three-way coalition of the UDP, the People's Progressive Party (PPP), and the Gambian People's Party (GPP). He again finished second behind Jammeh, winning 32.59% of the vote. In 2005, the UDP joined with four other opposition parties to form the National Alliance for Democracy and Development (NADD), in preparation for elections in late 2006 and early 2007. The alliance, however, disintegrated after the UDP and the National Reconciliation Party (NRP) withdrew in early 2006.

By the time the presidential election was held in September 2006, Darboe's UDP had formed another coalition with the NRP and the Gambia Party for Democracy and Progress (GPDP) called the 'Alliance for Regime Change'. In the election, Darboe's running mate was Hamat Bah. A United States diplomatic cable describing the election candidates called Darboe the "perennial candidate". It speculated by his opponent that Darboe seemed "to be relying on tribal loyalties to secure victory at the polls", and also noted that "it is not clear whether he would be a reliable ally for the U.S.". Jammeh won the election with 67.33% of the vote followed by Darboe, who won 26.69%. A third candidate representing the remaining NADD parties, Halifa Sallah, finished a distant third with 5.98% of the vote. Darboe rejected the official results of the election, saying that the election was not free and fair and that there was widespread voter intimidation.

Darboe was arrested in April 2016 for participating in protests demanding the body (dead or alive) of his party's Youth Leader, Ebrima Solo Sandeng, who was arrested by the state security agents, tortured and eventually died in custody, a day after his arrest. Darboe remained in jail, during the period leading up the December 2016 presidential election, and in his absence, Adama Barrow, a businessman without political experience, was designated as the party's presidential candidate( with Darboe's endorsement). In a shock result, Barrow, as the joint opposition candidate leading Coalition 2016, defeated Jammeh in the election. A few days after the election, Darboe was among 19 members of the opposition released from prison.

Minister of Foreign Affairs 
On 1 February 2017, Darboe was sworn in as Barrow's Minister of Foreign Affairs. The next day, he met with foreign diplomats accredited to the Gambia in order to "strengthen bilateral relations between the Gambia and the world". The same week as his swearing-in, it was confirmed that €33 million in foreign aid from the European Union that had been frozen under Jammeh's regime would be released to the Gambia.

In late 2017, Darboe courted controversy when he demanded that the president of Togo, Faure Gnassingbé, resign due to massive anti-government protests. He withdrew the statement a few days later.

Vice president 
In a cabinet reshuffle in June 2018, Darboe was promoted to the position of vice president and minister of presidential affairs, replacing Fatoumata Tambajang, who had held the position since November 2017. Darboe's tenure as vice president was fraught with reports of constant disagreement with President Adama Barrow. This would ultimately lead to his removal as vice president in a cabinet reshuffle of 15 March 2019, which also saw the removal of Amadou Sanneh and Lamin N. Dibba, both ministers belonging to the UDP.

Minority leader 
Following the 2022 elections, his party became the largest opposition in the National Assembly and he became the National Assembly Minority Leader.

Personal life 
Darboe is married with two wives and several children. His eldest daughter, Mariama, is a graduate of Tulane University in the United States. He is a sports enthusiast and served as vice president of the Gambian National Olympic and Sports Committee for several years, as well as chairman of the Gambia Wrestling Federation.

See also
List of foreign ministers in 2017
List of current foreign ministers

References

External links

 

1948 births
Living people
Vice-presidents of the Gambia
Gambian democracy activists
20th-century Gambian lawyers
2016–2017 Gambian constitutional crisis
United Democratic Party (Gambia) politicians
Gambian prisoners and detainees
University of Lagos alumni
University of Ottawa alumni
Government ministers of the Gambia
Leaders of political parties in the Gambia
Foreign ministers of the Gambia
Mandinka
21st-century Gambian lawyers